Philippa Christian (born 20 October 1987), is an Australian celebrity nanny, television personality and author, from Brighton, Victoria, Australia. She has been featured on several Australian and American television networks. plus National and International Radio. Her debut novel, Nanny Confidential, was published in the summer of 2015.

Career
Born in Brighton, Victoria in Australia, Christian began baby-sitting at age 11, rising to fame after working as a nanny for a number of Australian celebrities in Los Angeles, the Bahamas, and India.

Christian has built a reputation for professionalism, confidentiality and loyalty to her clients. She once famously refused $280,000 for a photo of a former client and his new celebrity girlfriend.

Christian has appeared regularly on National TV, Print

Writing
In the summer of 2015, Christian published her debut fictional novel, "Nanny Confidential" with Allen & Unwin, showcasing the life of an elite Celebrity Nanny. Ghost written by freelance writer, and former Gracia editor, Amy Molloy, the novel became a bestseller shortly after its release date.

Christian has also written articles on nannying for Estate and Manor magazine.

Radio
Following the success of Nanny Confidential, Christian is continually interviewed on Australian radio services, including the Kyle and Jackie O Show and 3AW with Denis Walter.

Recognised internationally, Christian has also appeared on the BBC World Service in an interview with Kim Chakanetsa, about what it takes to be a Celebrity Nanny.

Television
Christian has been featured on both Australian and American television networks.

She has appeared on numerous Australian morning television shows, including the Seven Network, and the Nine Network.

In February 2016 Christian was flown to Los Angeles to do a sit down interview with Entertainment Tonight

Public Speaking
Christian has completed extensive public speaking engagements, including nanny training schools and public events.  In 2015 Christian spoke at the Australian Nanny Conference in Sydney and in 2016 spoke at the Fairfax Essential Baby and Toddler show in Melbourne

References

External links
 official website

Living people
1987 births
People from Brighton, Victoria
Television personalities from Melbourne